Anwell Newman (born 10 December 1966) is a South African former cricketer. He played in eight first-class matches for Boland from 1993/94 to 1997/98.

See also
 List of Boland representative cricketers

References

External links
 

1966 births
Living people
South African cricketers
Boland cricketers
People from Stellenbosch
Cricketers from the Western Cape